Stinkwood, german Stinkholz, french Bois Puant, is the common name for a number of trees or shrubs which have wood or plant parts with an unpleasant odour, including:

Anagyris foetida; Southern Europe
Bignonia callistegioides (cipó d'alho); Southern Brasil
Celtis africana (white stinkwood); native to South Africa
Celtis mildbraedii (Natal white stinkwood, red-fruited white-stinkwood); native to Tropical Africa
Celtis timorensis; native to South and Southeast Asia
Coprosma foetidissima; in New Zealand and extends South to the Auckland Islands
Coprosma grandifolia; New Zealand
Coprosma putida; endemic to Lord Howe Island
Crateva tapia; (Páo, Pau or tapiá d'alho) Brasil to Central America
Cryptocarya latifolia (bastard stinkwood); South Africa
Dysoxylum alliaceum (german Knoblauchbaum); Southeast Asia
Eucryphia moorei; Southeast Australia
Fridericia elegans (cipó d'alho); Middle Eastern Brasil
Foetidia clusioides; native to Reunion and Mauritius
Foetidia mauritiana; native to Reunion and Mauritius
Frangula caroliniana (Syn.: Rhamnus caroliniana); Southern United States
Gallesia integrifolia (Syn.: Crateva gorarema) (german Knoblauchbaum, Páo, Pau d'alho); Brasil to Peru
Gustavia augusta; from South America
Gyrocarpus americanus; pantropical tree in family Hernandiaceae
Jacksonia furcellata (grey stinkwood); native to Australia
Jacksonia sternbergiana (green stinkwood); native to Australia
Juniperus sabina (german Stinkholz); Middle Europe to Asia
Lasianthus purpureus; Indonesia
Mansoa alliacea (cipó d'alho); Northern South America
Nyssa sylvatica; eastern to southeastern United States
Ocotea bullata (black stinkwood, true stinkwood); native to South Africa
other species of Ocotea, e.g. Ocotea foetens (Til, tilo), native to Macaronesia
Olax zeylanica (german Stinkholz); Sri Lanka, Bangladesh
Olax stricta (german Stinkholz); Eastern Australia
Owenia cepiodora (onionwood); Australia
Pararchidendron pruinosum ; Eastern Australia
Piscidia carthagenensis; Central America to Northern South America
Petersianthus macrocarpus (bastard stinkwood); South Africa
Pseudosmodingium perniciosum (Syn.: Rhus perniciosa); Western Mexico
Prunus africana (red stinkwood); native to montane Subsaharan Africa
Rhus aromatica; Eastern United States to Mexico and Tadzhikistan, Uzbekistan
Saprosma arborea; Indonesia
Scorodophloeus zenkeri (german Knoblauchrinde, garlic tree); Cameroon, Congo, Zaïre 
Seguieria americana (german Stinkholz, Knoblauchholz, as „Seguiera floribunda“, Páo, Pau or Cipó d'alho); Northern South America
Sorbus aucuparia (german Stinkholz); Europe to Western Russia, Iran
Sterculia foetida; India to Southeast Asia
Styphnolobium japonicum (Syn.: Macrotropis foetida); from South China
 Sideroxylon foetidissimum; Florida, South Mexico, Guatemala, Antilles
Zieria arborescens; native to Australia